Jill N. Craybas (born July 4, 1974) is an American former professional tennis player.

From the 2000 US Open to the 2011 US Open, Craybas competed in 45 consecutive Grand Slam main draws; her best result coming in the 2005 Wimbledon Championships where she reached the fourth round, which included wins over Marion Bartoli and Serena Williams. By the time she retired in 2013, she was one of the oldest players on the WTA Tour at 39 years of age, as well as the longest serving, having turned pro in 1996.

Early years
Craybas was born in Providence, Rhode Island. She received an athletic scholarship to attend the University of Florida in Gainesville, Florida, where she played for coach Andy Brandi's Florida Gators women's tennis team in National Collegiate Athletics Association (NCAA) and Southeastern Conference (SEC) competition from 1993 to 1996. As a senior, she won the 1996 NCAA women's singles tennis championship. She was the 1995–96 recipient of the Honda Sports Award for Tennis, recognizing her as the outstanding collegiate female tennis player of the year.

Craybas graduated from the University of Florida with a bachelor's degree in telecommunications in 1996, and has said in interviews that she hopes to enter film or television production when her playing career ends. She was inducted into the University of Florida Athletic Hall of Fame as a "Gator Great" in 2008.

Craybas credits her achievements to her long-time coach, Raja Chaudhuri who has worked with her from the start of her tennis career.

Professional career
Craybas turned professional in 1996. She won one title on the WTA Tour, at the Japan Open. She beat Silvija Talaja in the final, after trailing 4–0 in the third set. In the 2006 season, Craybas reached one quarterfinal at Hobart as the eighth seed, losing to unseeded Italian Mara Santangelo in three sets. She also reached the semifinals of a Tier-III event in Memphis, a fourth-round showing at the Tier-I event in Key Biscayne, Florida and a further quarterfinal appearance at Stanford in late July.

Craybas is best known for her 2005 defeat of Serena Williams in the third round of Wimbledon. She beat Williams 6–3, 7–6, then lost to Serena's older sister, and eventual champion, Venus Williams 0–6, 2–6.

On March 25, 2006, Craybas once again served up an early round defeat of a top-seeded player. This time it was second-seeded Kim Clijsters in the second round of the Key Biscayne WTA tournament. After having led in both the first and third sets, Clijsters eventually lost by a score of 5–7, 6–3, 5–7. It was Clijsters earliest ever exit in Key Biscayne, and she was the defending champion.

By that time Craybas, then a veteran on the tour, was thought to be playing the best tennis of her life. However, after having a successful start to 2006, she fell short of what was expected of her from her dramatically impressive start, losing to lower-ranked opponents in first rounds or having difficult first round draws against the top players in the world.

She began 2007 by reaching the semifinals of a Tier-IV event in New Zealand, the Auckland Open. She beat all of her opponents in straight sets before bowing out to Vera Zvonareva, 3–6, 5–7. She next took part in the Tier-II event in Sydney, where she lost in the last round of qualifying to Vera Dushevina, 1–6, 6–3, 1–6. At the first Grand Slam tournament of the year at the Australian Open, she suffered a first-round loss to the tenth-seeded Nicole Vaidišová. Craybas bounced back into winning form at her next tournament in the U.S., at an ITF tournament in Midland, Michigan. As the top-seeded, she beat all of her opponents in straight sets until a hard-fought 2–6, 6–3, 6–3 victory over second-seeded and fellow American Laura Granville. Because of her lower ranking, she suffered in tough draws, not going further than the second round of any tournament since.

At the start of 2008, Craybas entered the Pattaya Open, where, as the seventh seed, she played some of the best tennis of her career and beat Olga Savchuk 6–1, 6–1 in the first round, Renata Voráčová 2–6, 6–1, 6–3 in the second and Andreja Klepač 6–4, 6–4 in the quarterfinals. In the semifinals, she beat Akgul Amanmuradova 6–4, 6–0, and lost to the top seed Agnieszka Radwańska in a tie-break in the third set. Craybas's ranking improved from world No. 77 to No. 60 because of these results.

Craybas won the 2008 Istanbul Cup in doubles.

She represented the United States at the 2008 Summer Olympics in the women's singles tournament. She became the last qualifier for the event, replacing Tamira Paszek of Austria. The opening came available when fellow American Ashley Harkleroad elected to skip the games after she became pregnant. At the US Open 2013, Craybas announced her retirement from tennis.

WTA career finals

Singles: 2 (1 title, 1 runner-up)

Doubles: 14 (5 titles, 9 runner-ups)

Mixed doubles: 1 runner-up

Grand Slam performance timelines

Singles

Doubles

See also

Florida Gators
List of Florida Gators tennis players
List of University of Florida alumni
List of University of Florida Olympians
List of University of Florida Athletic Hall of Fame members

References
Craybas announces retirement

External links

 
 

1974 births
Living people
American female tennis players
Florida Gators women's tennis players
Olympic tennis players of the United States
Sportspeople from Providence, Rhode Island
Tennis people from Rhode Island
Tennis players at the 2008 Summer Olympics
Lincoln School (Providence, Rhode Island) alumni